Eisner or Eissner may refer to:

 Eisner (surname), including a list of people with the name
 Eisner Loboa (born 1987), Colombian-born Mexican footballer
 , several United States Navy ships
 Eisner Peak, Graham Land, Antarctica
 Eisner Award, annual awards for achievement in comics
 Eisner Food Stores, a chain of supermarkets in Illinois and Indiana from 1901 to 1981

See also 
 William F. Eisner Museum of Advertising & Design, a museum in Milwaukee, Wisconsin